Patrick Huerre, born in 1947, is a French physicist in fluid mechanics. An engineer from the École centrale de Paris (1970), and a doctor of aeronautical sciences from Stanford University, he began his career at the University of Southern California in Los Angeles. In 1989, he was appointed Professor of Mechanics at the École polytechnique where he created, with Jean-Marc Chomaz, and then directed the Laboratoire d'hydrodynamique (LadHyX), a joint CNRS-École polytechnique research unit. He is currently Director of Research Emeritus at the Centre national de la recherche scientifique (CNRS). He is a member of the French Academy of Sciences.

Biography

Training 
He received an engineering degree from the École centrale de Paris in 1970. He then obtained a master's degree and a doctorate in aeronautical sciences from Stanford University (1971, 1976).

Career 
During his PhD (1971-1975), Patrick Huerre was a Research Assistant in the Department of Aeronautics and Astronautics at Stanford University. From 1976 to 1978, he was a postdoctoral fellow with David Crighton in the Department of Applied Mathematics at the University of Leeds. In 1978, he was hired by Janos Laufer as Assistant Professor of Aerospace Engineering at the University of Southern California, Los Angeles. He will then be promoted to Associate Professor and then Professor. In 1989, he returned to France after his appointment as Professor of Mechanics at the École polytechnique, a position he held until 2012. In 1990, he and Jean-Marc Chomaz founded the Hydrodynamics Laboratory (LadHyX), which he managed until 2008. At the same time, from 1991 to 2012, he was Director of Research at the CNRS. He is currently Director of Research Emeritus. He was invited in 2015 as a Professor at the Miller Institute for basic research in science at the University of California at Berkeley.

Scientific work 
Patrick Huerre's theoretical research focuses on fluid dynamics. Most of his work focuses on hydrodynamic instabilities to account for the transition to chaos or turbulence in sheared flows. The configurations studied are, for example, the Bénard-Karman vortex path in the wake of a cylinder or the Kelvin-Helmholtz vortices in the mixing layer separating two parallel flows of different speeds. The use of the concepts of convective/absolute instability allowed him to make a rigorous distinction between amplifier-type and oscillator-type flows.  The introduction, for oscillators, of the notion of linear global mode has thus led to the establishment of frequency selection criteria in very good agreement with the experiments. These concepts were then generalized to the fully non-linear regime. In aero-acoustics, Patrick Huerre has identified super-directiveness as a key concept in the production of aerodynamic noise in sheared flows. Over the past decade, it has characterized the acoustic radiation of global modes present in hot jets and the overall instability properties of plumes. He now turns to the asymptotic analysis of critical baroclinic layers and their role in the generation of "zombie" eddies in proto-planetary disks in astrophysics.

Honours and awards 

    1992: Montyon Prize, French Academy of Sciences
    1993: Fellow of the American Physical Society
    1994-1998: Co-Editor, European Journal of Mechanics B / Fluids
    1998: Batchelor Lecture, University of Cambridge
    1999-2009: Associate Editor-in-Chief, Journal of Fluid Mechanics
    2002: Grand Prix Lazare Carnot, French Academy of Sciences
    2002: Member of the French Academy of Sciences
    2003-2012: President of the European Mechanical Society (EUROMECH)
    2003: Chevallier of the Légion d'Honneur
    2010: Chevallier of the Palmes Académiques
    2012: Laufer Lecture, University of Southern California

References 

Fellows of the American Physical Society
American Physical Society
French physicists
Members of the French Academy of Sciences
1947 births
Living people